The 2021–22 season is Barnsley's 135th year in existence and their third consecutive season in the Championship. Along with the league, the club will also compete in the FA Cup and the EFL Cup. The season covers the period from 1 July 2021 to 30 June 2022.

Managerial changes
During pre-season, Valérien Ismaël departed the club as head coach and joined West Bromwich Albion. Five days later Markus Schopp was appointed head coach on a three-year contract.

Pre-season friendlies
Barnsley revealed as part of their pre-season preparations, they would have pre-season friendly matches against AFC Fylde, Rochdale, Sheffield Wednesday, Morecambe, Watford and Manchester City.

Competitions

Championship

League table

Results summary

Results by matchday

Matches
Barnsley's league fixtures were announced on 24 June 2021.

FA Cup

Barnsley were drawn at home to Barrow in the third round.

EFL Cup

On 24 June 2021, the first round draw was confirmed.

Statistics

Players with names in italics and marked * were on loan from another club for the whole of their season with Barnsley.

|-
!colspan=14|Players out on loan:

|-
!colspan=14|Players who left the club:

|}

Goals record

Disciplinary record

Transfers

Transfers in

Loans in

Loans out

Transfers out

References

Barnsley
Barnsley F.C. seasons